Ran Margaliot (born July 18, 1988) is an Israeli former professional racing cyclist.

Major results
2004
 National Novice Road Championships
1st  Road race
2nd Time trial
2005
 3rd Road race, National Junior Road Championships
2010
 1st Overall Tour of Israel (with Niv Libner)
1st stages 1, 2, 3 % 4 (with Niv Libner)
 3rd Road race, National Road Championships

References

External links

1988 births
Living people
Israeli male cyclists